Lost World is a pinball machine released by Bally in 1977. The game features a fantasy theme. It should not to be confused with the pinball machine Escape from the Lost World from 1987.

Description
Lost World is the first pinball machine that uses electronic sounds which replaces chimes. It is also the first machine that uses a photographic backglass. The game spawned a sequel - Paragon released in 1979.

The machine features a simple gameplay with the goal of hitting the A-B-C-D-E-F targets repeatedly. The playfield contains very few other feature including three pop bumpers, two kickouts, a captive ball and a spinner.

The backglass depicts a dragon, a warrior and a woman. Designer Paul Faris and his wife were the models for the latter. His daughter was later also the model for the Christine Daaé character on the backglass of the pinball machine The Phantom of the Opera.

Digital versions
Lost World is a playable table in Williams Pinball Classics (2001) by Encore, Inc. for PC.

References

External links

1977 pinball machines
Bally pinball machines
Pinball video games
Windows games